The Spreča is a river of northeastern Bosnia and Herzegovina, a tributary of the Bosna. Its source is located in the village of Snagovo in Zvornik municipality, and it reaches the Bosna at the city of Doboj. A damming of the Spreča in the municipality of Lukavac forms Modrac Lake. The  river also flows through the town of Gračanica.

References

Rivers of Bosnia and Herzegovina